Robert Mezey (February 28, 1935 – April 25, 2020) was an American poet, critic and academic. He was also a noted translator, in particular from Spanish, having translated with Richard Barnes the collected poems of Borges.

He was born in Philadelphia, and attended Kenyon College as a contemporary of E. L. Doctorow and James Wright; after a time and serving in the army he finished in 1959 an undergraduate degree at the University of Iowa.
Having worked for a while, he became a graduate student at Stanford University.
Then he began teaching at Case Western Reserve University, in 1963.
During a year at Franklin and Marshall College he was for a time suspended after an accusation of inciting students to burn draft cards. After holding other positions, he settled in 1976 at Pomona College, until retiring in 2000.

He received numerous awards including the 2002 Poets' Prize for Collected Poems: 1952-1999.

Works
"Fishing Around", The New Yorker, January 21, 2008
The Lovemaker (1960), poems, received the Lamont Poetry Prize in 1961.
White Blossoms (1965), poems
A Book of Dying, poems
The Mercy of Sorrow, poems
Naked Poetry (1969), anthology, editor with Stephen Berg
The Door Standing Open: Selected Poems (1970)
Poems from the Hebrew (1973), translator
Small Song (1979), poems
Tungsteno, novel by Caesar Vallejo (1982), translator
Evening Wind (1987), poems
Couplets
Selected Translations
The Collected Poems of Henri Coulette (1990), editor with Donald Justice
Natural Selection (1995), poems
Thomas Hardy: Selected Poems (1998), editor
The Poetry of E. A. Robinson (1999), editor
Collected Poems 1952-1999 (2000)
Poems of the American West (2002), editor
Poems of Jorge Luis Borges, translator with Richard Barnes

References

External links
"Review: The Poetry of Robert Mezey", Chicago Review, Peter Michelson, Vol. 16, No. 2 (Summer, 1963), pp. 123–128
New Poem, ‘Please?’ New Poetry at The Flea, Broadsheet 14, March 2011.

1935 births
2020 deaths
Formalist poets
Poets from California
American male poets
Pomona College faculty
Kenyon College alumni
University of Iowa alumni
Stanford University alumni
Case Western Reserve University faculty
Writers from Philadelphia